Peta Jane Buscombe, Baroness Buscombe (née O'Flynn, born 12 March 1954) is an English barrister, regulator and politician. She is a Conservative member of the House of Lords. Lady Buscombe was Chief Executive of the Advertising Association from 2007 to 2009.  She served as Chairman of the Press Complaints Commission from April 2009 until 16 October 2011.

Early life and career 

She was educated at Rosebery Grammar School, Epsom, and the Inns of Court School of Law. She was called to the Bar at the Inner Temple in 1977 and worked as a Legal Advisor for the Dairy Trade Federation from 1979 to 1980. She then worked as Legal Counsel for Barclays Bank International and Barclays Bank plc until 1984, after which she was Assistant Secretary for the Institute of Practitioners in Advertising until 1987. She was joint managing partner of Buscombe and Fiala, an international art business, from 1991 to 1995. She was a District Councillor for Nettlebed, Oxfordshire 1995 to 1999.

Political career 

She stood as the Conservative candidate in Slough at the 1997 General Election. She became Conservative party Vice-Chairman for development 1997 to 1999. Numerous positions as Shadow Minister or Lead spokesperson House of Lords 1999 to 2007 including Education and Skills; DCMS; Home, Constitutional and Legal Affairs; Cabinet Office; Social Security and Trade & Industry.

On 23 July 1998 she was created a Life peer as Baroness Buscombe, of Goring in the County of Oxfordshire. She has been a Conservative front bench spokesman in the House of Lords on several briefs including Business, Innovation and Skills; Culture, Media and Sport; Education; and Home Constitutional and Legal Affairs; and was also a member of the Joint Committee on Human Rights.

Her voting record has been summarised from Public Whip. She has voted moderately against introducing ID cards, more EU integration, a stricter asylum system and the hunting ban. She has voted in favour of taking steps to combat climate change. She voted moderately for greater autonomy for schools.

On 21 December 2016, she was appointed as Baroness in Waiting (i.e. government whip in the House of Lords). She was lead Spokesperson for DCMS, BEIS and MOI 2016 to 2017.

She became Government Minister for Work and Pensions, House of Lords, June 2017 – July 2019. During that time she was the small business champion, work and pensions. She represented the Department for Work & Pensions at UN Convention of Human Rights of Persons with Disabilities 2019, Soeul Winter Paralympics 2018, G7 Labour & Employment Ministers Meeting on Diversity in Employment and the Future of Work, Paris 2019, and G20 meeting on Equality in the Workplace and the Future of Work, Argentina 2018.

Numerous Committees in Parliament: including Digital and Communications Committee from 2019, Joint Committee for the National Security Strategy 2015 to 2017, Joint Committee on Human Rights 2015 to 2016.

Professional career 

She became Chief Executive of the Advertising Association from 2007 to 2009, where she led the implementation of the Change4Life campaign, a Government-sponsored scheme backed by consumer and media brands which was designed to tackle obesity across the UK. Marketing Week editor Stuart Smith described Buscombe as "the most formidable advocate the commercial communications sector has seen in years".

She became chair of the Press Complaints Commission in April 2009 until October 2011.

She was a non-executive director of Affinity Water plc (formerly Three Valleys Water) until 2015 and Local World until 2016, and was also chairman of the advisory board of Samaritans until 2017. She was inaugural Patron for The Sculpture in Schools Awards until 2008. She was a Trustee Index on Censorship 2015 to 2017.

She was a governor at Langley Hall Primary Academy in Langley, Berkshire, until 2016.

Current appointments 

She was elected Master Buscombe, Inner Temple, as an Other Governing Bencher in 2019.

Personal life 

She married Philip Buscombe in 1980. They have three children.

Arms

References

External links 

Profile at Parliament of the United Kingdom

1954 births
Conservative Party (UK) life peers
English barristers
Life peeresses created by Elizabeth II
Living people
Members of the Inner Temple
British women lawyers
Conservative Party (UK) parliamentary candidates